A mech or mecha is a large, pilotable machine.
 	
Mech may also refer to:
 Mech (surname)
 Mech infantry or mechanized infantry
 Mech language or Bodo
 Mech radar, a Russian airborne radar system
 Mech tribe, a tribe of India and belong to Bodo-Kachari group of tribes
 Mech, a type of electronic cigarette; see Construction of electronic cigarettes
 Mechanical keyboard

See also
 Mecha anime and manga, a genre of anime and manga that features giant robots
 Mechanics
 Mechanism (engineering)